Shao Jieni (born 24 January 1994) is a Chinese-born Portuguese table tennis player.

Originally from Anshan, Shao Jieni began her professional career in Beijing. In 2010, at the age of sixteen and without speaking any English or Portuguese, she moved to Gondomar, Portugal to play for the Ala de Nun'Álvares de Gondomar club. She registered with the Portugal Table Tennis Federation in April 2013 and became a Portuguese national in August 2015.

She competed at the 2016 Summer Olympics in the women's singles event, in which she was eliminated in the second round by Lily Zhang.

Achievements

ITTF Tours
Women's singles

Women's doubles

References

1994 births
Living people
Chinese emigrants to Portugal
Portuguese female table tennis players
Chinese female table tennis players
Olympic table tennis players of Portugal
Table tennis players at the 2016 Summer Olympics
Table tennis players at the 2020 Summer Olympics
Table tennis players from Anshan
Naturalised table tennis players
Chinese expatriate sportspeople in Portugal
Table tennis players at the 2019 European Games
European Games silver medalists for Portugal

Portuguese people of Chinese descent